Allford Hall Monaghan Morris is an architecture practice based in Clerkenwell, London, with offices in Bristol and Oklahoma.

History
Set up in 1989 by Simon Allford, Jonathan Hall, Paul Monaghan and Peter Morris, the practice employs over 500 people working on projects in education, healthcare, housing, arts and offices. In 2017, it became majority employee-owned through an employee ownership trust.

Notable projects
 Saatchi Gallery, Chelsea (2008) 
 Burntwood School, Wandsworth
 Assembly, Bristol

Awards
 British Construction Industry Award (BCIA) for the category of Building Project between £3-50m, 2002
 RIBA London Building of the Year, 2008
 CABE’s Building for Life Award, 2008
 GLA London Planning Awards for Best New Place to Live, 2008
 Housing Design Award, 2008
BCIA Building Project Award, 2009
AIA Award for Architecture, 2010
Civic Trust Award, 2010
 London Planning Awards Best New Public Space 2010
 BCIA Local Authority Award, 2011
 RIBA Stirling Prize 2015
 LIFT Award for Best Design for a Healthcare Project

References

External links
 Official website

Architecture firms based in London